Euryomma muisca is a species of fly in the genus Euryomma. It was first described by Grisales et al. in 2012.

Etymology 
Euryomma muisca is named after the Muisca, who inhabited the central highlands (Altiplano Cundiboyacense) of present-day Colombia where the fly has been found.

Description 
The fly has dark brown frontal vitta, the length of the postpedicel is 1.5 times the length of the pedicel.

See also 

List of flora and fauna named after the Muisca

References

Bibliography 
 
 

Fanniidae
Diptera of South America
Arthropods of Colombia
Endemic fauna of Colombia
Altiplano Cundiboyacense
Muisca
Insects described in 2012